John Albert "Honest John" Warren (November 10, 1904 – March 10, 1981) was an American football player and coach of football, basketball, baseball, and track.  He served as the head football coach the University of Oregon for one season in 1942, tallying a mark of 2–6, and as the head basketball coach at Oregon for five seasons (1944–1945, 1947–1951), compiling a record of 87–76.

Early life and coaching career
Warren was born in La Grande, Oregon, and was raised on a farm near Helix, Oregon. He played on the Oregon Ducks football team in 1926 and 1927.

Warren coached high school basketball at Astoria High School, leading the Fishermen and its two stars Bobby Anet and Wally Johansen to two consecutive state championships in 1934 and 1935. In 1935, Warren was hired as the freshman basketball coach at the University of Oregon, where he coached Johansen and Anet who had enrolled at the school. Four years later, Johansen and Anet were the core of Oregon's 1939 national championship team.

Warren founded John Warren Sporting Goods after purchasing a local hardware store in 1951. The store went out of business shortly after his death in 1981.

Death
Warren died in Los Angeles on March 10, 1981, after suffering a heart attack on February 26, 1981, while on vacation in Mexico.

Head coaching record

Football

Basketball

References

1904 births
1981 deaths
Oregon Ducks baseball coaches
Oregon Ducks football coaches
Oregon Ducks football players
Oregon Ducks men's basketball coaches
Oregon Ducks track and field coaches
High school basketball coaches in the United States
People from La Grande, Oregon
People from Umatilla County, Oregon
Coaches of American football from Oregon
Players of American football from Oregon
Basketball coaches from Oregon